Autocharis mimetica is a moth in the family Crambidae. It is found in Australia, where it has been recorded from Western Australia, the Northern Territory and Queensland.

References

Odontiinae
Moths described in 1903
Moths of Australia